The following is a list of Bucknell Bison men's basketball head coaches. The Bison have had 21 coaches in their 128-season history.

Bucknell's current head coach is Nathan Davis. He was hired in April 2015 to replace Dave Paulsen, who left to become the head coach at George Mason.

References

Bucknell

Bucknell Bison men's basketball coaches